Paha is an unincorporated community in Adams County, Washington, United States. It is located along BNSF Railway's Lakeside Subdivision. Paha is assigned the ZIP code 99169.

A post office called Paha was established in 1886, and remained in operation until 1943. The name Paha is Indian in origin.

References

Unincorporated communities in Adams County, Washington
Unincorporated communities in Washington (state)